Mexipyrgus carranzae is a species of very small freshwater snail, an aquatic gastropod mollusk in the family Cochliopidae.

Distribution 
This species is endemic to Cuatro Ciénegas valley, in Chihuahuan Desert, Mexico.

Ecology 
Mexipyrgus carranzae is generally found only in soft sediment.

Water lily Nymphaea ampla is the most common aquatic macrophyte in abundance in its habitats. According to the isotope analysis by Chaves-Campos et al. (2012) it is probable that Mexipyrgus churinceanus feed on water lily Nymphaea ampla organic matter metabolized by sediment bacteria.

Predators of Mexithauma quadripaludium include the specialized snail-eating (molluscivorous) cichlid fish Herichthys minckleyi.

References
This article incorporates CC-BY-2.5 text from the reference

Further reading 
 Johnson S. G. (2005). "Age, phylogeography and population structure of the microendemic banded spring snail, Mexipyrgus churinceanus". Molecular Ecology 14(8): 2299-2311. .
 Johnson S. G., Hulsey C. D. & León F. J. G. de (2007). "Spatial mosaic evolution of snail defensive traits". BMC Evolutionary Biology 7: 50. .

Cochliopidae
Endemic molluscs of Mexico
Gastropods described in 1966
Mexican Plateau